Tritech may refer to one of two companies:

 TriTech Software Systems, an American software company based in San Diego, California
 Tritech Technology, a radio technology company based in Stockholm, Sweden